The 2016–17 season was the 93rd season in the existence of AEK Athens F.C. and the 56th competitive season and second consecutive in the top flight of Greek football. They competed in the Super League, the Greek Cup and the 2016–17 UEFA Europa League. The season began on 28 July 2016 and finished on 31 May 2017.

Events
 29 May 2016 Before 2015–16 Super League Greece the campaign was over, Tasos Bakasetas agreed to a two-year contract with AEK Athens which was made effective on 1 July.
5 June 2016 Former AEK Athens player, Temur Ketsbaia reached an agreement to be the new coach of the team.

Players

Squad information

NOTE: The players are the ones that have been announced by the AEK Athens' press release. No edits should be made unless a player arrival or exit is announced. Updated 30 June 2017, 23:59 UTC+3.

Transfers

In

Summer

Winter

Out

Summer

Winter

Loan in

Winter

Loan out

Summer

Winter

Renewals

Overall transfer activity

Spending
Summer:  €950,000

Winter:  €200,000

Total:  €1,150,000

Income
Summer:  €750,000

Winter:  €0

Total:  €750,000

Expenditure
Summer:  €200,000

Winter:  €200,000

Total:  €400,000

Pre-season and friendlies

Super League

Regular season

League table

Results summary

Results by Matchday

Fixtures

Play-offs

Table

Results by Matchday

Fixtures

Greek Cup

Group F

Matches

Group stage

Round of 16

Quarter-finals

Semi-finals

Final

UEFA Europa League

Third qualifying round

Statistics

Squad statistics

! colspan="13" style="background:#FFDE00; text-align:center" | Goalkeepers
|-

! colspan="13" style="background:#FFDE00; color:black; text-align:center;"| Defenders
|-

! colspan="13" style="background:#FFDE00; color:black; text-align:center;"| Midfielders
|-

! colspan="13" style="background:#FFDE00; color:black; text-align:center;"| Forwards
|-

! colspan="13" style="background:#FFDE00; color:black; text-align:center;"| Left during Summer Transfer Window
|-

! colspan="13" style="background:#FFDE00; color:black; text-align:center;"| Left during Winter Transfer Window
|-

|-
|}

Disciplinary record

|-
! colspan="20" style="background:#FFDE00; text-align:center" | Goalkeepers

|-
! colspan="20" style="background:#FFDE00; color:black; text-align:center;"| Defenders

|-
! colspan="20" style="background:#FFDE00; color:black; text-align:center;"| Midfielders

|-
! colspan="20" style="background:#FFDE00; color:black; text-align:center;"| Forwards

|-
! colspan="20" style="background:#FFDE00; color:black; text-align:center;"| Left during Summer Transfer window

|-
! colspan="20" style="background:#FFDE00; color:black; text-align:center;"| Left during Winter Transfer window

|-
|}

Starting 11

Goalscorers

References

External links
AEK Athens F.C. Official Website

AEK Athens F.C. seasons
AEK Athens
AEK Athens